The 1954–55 DDR-Oberliga was the sixth season of the DDR-Oberliga, the first tier of league football in East Germany. After the 1954–55 season the league played a transition round in autumn 1955, followed by five seasons, until 1960, where it played in the calendar year format. From 1961–62 onwards the league returned to its traditional format.

The league was contested by fourteen teams, one less than in the previous season, a strength the DDR-Oberliga would operate at for the rest of its history. BSG Turbine Erfurt won the championship, its second consecutive one for the club, becoming the first club to win back-to-back titles.

Willy Tröger of SC Wismut Karl-Marx-Stadt was the league's top scorer with 22 goals.

Two teams were relocated during the season, in November 1954, with Dynamo Dresden relocating to East Berlin to continue as SC Dynamo Berlin and BSG Empor Lauter relocating to Rostock to continue as SC Empor Rostock. A number clubs were also replaced by the new Sport clubs from October 1954 onwards, indicated by the SC before the name, to concentrate the best players in centers of excellence at certain locations and to improve the level of the game in East Germany. The football department of BSG Wismut Aue was delegated to the newly founded sports club SC Wismut Karl-Marx-Stadt, but the team remained in Aue and did not move to Chemnitz, then called Karl-Marx-Stadt, despite joining SC Wismut Karl-Marx-Stadt. BSG Einheit Ost and BSG Chemie Leipzig were dissolved, and their football players were delegated to the newly founded sports clubs SC Rotation Leipzig and SC Lokomotive Leipzig respectively. 

Unlike the 1954–55 champions of West Germany and the Saar Protectorate the East German champion did not take part in the  first edition of the European Cup the following season. It would take until 1957–58 for the DDR-Oberliga winner to compete in Europe.

Table
The 1954–55 season saw two newly promoted clubs, ASK Vorwärts Berlin and BSG Chemie Karl-Marx-Stadt.

Results

References

Sources

External links
 Das Deutsche Fussball Archiv  Historic German league tables

1954-55
Ober
1954–55 in East German football